The 2020 Alaska Aces season was the 34th season of the franchise in the Philippine Basketball Association (PBA).

Key dates
December 8: The 2019 PBA draft took place in Midtown Atrium, Robinson Place Manila.
March 11: The PBA postponed the season due to the threat of the coronavirus.

Draft

Special draft

Regular draft

Roster

  also serves as Alaska's board governor.

Philippine Cup

Eliminations

Standings

Game log

|-bgcolor=ffcccc
| 1
| October 11
| TNT
| L 95–100
| Abu Tratter (17)
| Robbie Herndon (8)
| JVee Casio (9)
| AUF Sports Arena & Cultural Center
| 0–1
|-bgcolor=ffcccc
| 2
| October 14
| Meralco
| L 81–93
| Jeron Teng (25)
| Robbie Herndon (8)
| 4 players (2)
| AUF Sports Arena & Cultural Center
| 0–2
|-bgcolor=ccffcc
| 3
| October 17
| Magnolia
| W 87–81
| Jeron Teng (19)
| Abu Tratter (9)
| Vic Manuel (4)
| AUF Sports Arena & Cultural Center
| 1–2
|-bgcolor=ccffcc
| 4
| October 20
| Blackwater
| W 120–82
| Barkley Eboña (24)
| Vic Manuel (9)
| Jeron Teng (7)
| AUF Sports Arena & Cultural Center
| 2–2
|-bgcolor=ccffcc
| 5
| October 22
| Rain or Shine
| W 89–88
| Vic Manuel (18)
| Vic Manuel (7)
| Jeron Teng (8)
| AUF Sports Arena & Cultural Center
| 3–2
|-bgcolor=ffcccc
| 6
| October 24
| San Miguel
| L 88–92
| Manuel, Eboña (18)
| Abu Tratter (13)
| Jeron Teng (7)
| AUF Sports Arena & Cultural Center
| 3–3
|-bgcolor=ccffcc
| 7
| October 27
| Terrafirma
| W 99–96
| Vic Manuel (18)
| Abu Tratter (11)
| Casio, Eboña (3)
| AUF Sports Arena & Cultural Center
| 4–3
|-bgcolor=ccffcc
| 8
| October 29
| Phoenix
| W 105–97
| Vic Manuel (24)
| Rodney Brondial (10)
| Robbie Herndon (7)
| AUF Sports Arena & Cultural Center
| 5–3

|-bgcolor=ffcccc
| 9
| November 3
| Ginebra
| L 81–87
| Vic Manuel (17)
| Rodney Brondial (9)
| Vic Manuel (4)
| AUF Sports Arena & Cultural Center
| 5–4
|-bgcolor=ccffcc
| 10
| November 6
| NorthPort
| W 102–94
| Brondial, Tratter (16)
| Rodney Brondial (10)
| Jeron Teng (6)
| AUF Sports Arena & Cultural Center
| 6–4
|-bgcolor=ccffcc
| 11
| November 9
| NLEX
| W 122–119 OT
| Maverick Ahanmisi (25)
| Brondial, Ahanmisi (12)
| Jeron Teng (5)
| AUF Sports Arena & Cultural Center
| 7–4

Playoffs

Bracket

References

Alaska Aces (PBA) seasons
Alaska Aces